Çamlık can refer to:

 Çamlık, Bartın
 Çamlık, Çaycuma
 Çamlık, Giresun
 Çamlık, Mudanya
 Çamlık, Yeniçağa
 Çamlık Railway Museum
 Çamlık railway station